Nicholas Ayars “Nick” Lore is a social scientist specializing in career design methodology and multiple intelligences, author, and the founder of the Rockport Institute.

Career design methodology
His methodology includes a system of step-by-step inquiry during which people achieve certainty about their unique expression of those key elements. This methodology also includes a suite of tools and inquiries to deal with the doubts, fears and uncertainties that arise.
A central concept of his work states that too many people concentrate their career goals on extrinsic rewards such as high salary and prestige and unnecessarily sacrifice intrinsic values such as job satisfaction. He asserts that a well-chosen career will provide both.

Rockport Institute
Lore founded the Rockport Institute in 1981. The Rockport Institute performs testing on clients to identify personality traits, personal values and talents, from which customized career suggestions are then based upon. His Rockport career design methodology asserts that traditional prescriptive career counseling, in which a client takes a personality and interest test, and is then supplied with a list of suitable jobs leaves out many factors crucial to career success and fulfillment. His answer was to develop "career design coaching," later called simply "career coaching."

Works
 
 
 Lore, Nicholas (September 27, 2000). "Like a Movie Star." The Iranian.

References

Further reading
 Vaughn, Susan (November 5, 2000). "Career Make-Over; Vague Goals Hurt Quest for Fulfilling Job." Los Angeles Times. 
 Vaughn, Susan (February 6, 2000). "Work & Careers; Career Make-Over; He Wants to Hang Up Stethoscope." Los Angeles Times. 
 Kahlenberg, Rebecca R. (January 1, 2006). "A Coach for Your Career Change; Outside Assistance Helps the Process End Favorably." The Washington Post. 
 (May 11, 2008). "Career Guide a Great Present for Grad." St. Paul Pioneer Press. 
 Trimarchi, Michael (March 17, 1991). "For Some Workers, Pinning Down Aptitudes May Help Attitudes." The Washington Post. 
 (June 4, 2008). "Don't force a career." Kansas City Star.

External links
 Rockport Institute biography
 Yale Graduate School recommendation of aptitude testing by Rockport Institute

1944 births
Living people
American self-help writers
American social scientists
New Thought writers